Freeport-McMoRan Inc., often called Freeport, is an American mining company based in the Freeport-McMoRan Center, in Phoenix, Arizona. The company is the world's largest producer of molybdenum, is a major copper producer and operates the world's largest gold mine, the Grasberg mine in Papua, Indonesia.

History

The current company was created in 1981 through the merger of Freeport Minerals, formerly Texas Freeport Sulphur Company and McMoRan Oil & Gas Company, becoming Freeport-McMoRan Inc.

Early history
Freeport Sulphur Company was founded July 12, 1912 by the eldest son of Svante Magnus "E.M." Swenson, banker Eric Pierson Swenson, with a group of investors, to develop sulfur mining at Bryan Mound salt dome, along the US Gulf Coast. Freeport, Texas was also established in Nov. 1912 to house workers, and serve as a port for Houston, rivaling Galveston and Corpus Christi.

Freeport mined sulfur along the Gulf Coast using the Frasch Process, the patents for which had expired in 1912. Previously, Union Sulphur Company founder and patent-holder Herman Frasch had enjoyed a monopoly on the process.<ref>Hazleton, Jared "The Economics of the Sulphur Industry, Routledge, 2016, p. 204.</ref> The company became known as Freeport Sulphur, later changing its corporate name to Freeport Minerals.

In 1922, Freeport started producing sulfur from Hoskins Mound in Brazoria County, Texas.

Freeport Texas Company
Enterprise to support Freeport Sulphur's business and the new town's infrastructure led to the incorporation of a holding company on September 30, 1913, to join the newer assets with Freeport Sulphur. Officers of the new holding company, Freeport Texas Company, were:
 Eric. P. Swenson, President and Director (Freeport Sulphur founder, son of Swante M. Swenson)
 Edward E. Dickinson, Vice-President and Director
 F.M. Altz, Secretary
 Swante M. Swenson, Treasurer (son of Eric P. Swenson)
 Charles H. Findlay, Auditor (son of Hugh Findlay and his third wife, Mary Ellen Smith)
 Richard H. Williams, Director (son of Richard H. Williams)
 Harry K. Knapp, Director
 Samuel McRoberts, Director
 Charles P. Northrop, Director
 Charles A. Stone, Director
 Frank A. Vanderlip, Director
 Sidell Tilghman, Director (son of General Lloyd Tilghman)
 Eppa Hunton Jr., Director (son of late Virginia Senator, Brig. Gen. Eppa Hunton)
 Charles E. Herrmann, Director.Dana & Co.The Commercial and Financial Chronicle (Weekly), Volume 110, Part 2, William B. Dana Company, New York, 1920, p. 760. Retrieved March 2, 2018.

The new corporation's principal assets were listed as:
 Freeport Sulphur
 Freeport Gas Co.
 Freeport Sulphur Transportation Company
 Freeport Town Site Co.
 Freeport Terminal Co.
 Freeport Light, Water & Ice Co.
 South Texas Stevedore Co.
 La Espuela Oil Co.
 Société pour l'Importation et la Vente des Soufres
 Houston & Brazoz Valley Ry

In 1919, minority stockholders John R. Williams & Sons, First National Bank of Richmond, Virginia vice-president, W. M. Addison, Benjamin P Alsopp, E. L. Norton, and Samuel W. Travers solicited proxies to use at the April 5th annual stockholders' meeting, claiming, according to reports, that "management has refused them adequate information regarding the property. President E.P. Swenson denies that information has been thus withheld and states that the board, which represents the dominant interests, has no vacancies at the present time."

1928–1931 shareholder proxy fight
In 1928, shareholder and scion of one of the founding investment firms, John Langbourne Williams & Sons, Langbourne Meade Williams, Jr. launched a proxy fight for control of the company. In 1929, he then sought help from his former supervisor at Lee, Higginson & Co., J.T. Claiborne, who then enlisted clerk John Hay Whitney – who had become one of the wealthiest men in America following the 1927 death of his father, Payne Whitney. Williams eventually gained control of the company from founder Swenson, becoming its president in 1931, with Claiborne as a Vice-President, and Whitney as Chairman. Williams also served as Chairman during 1958–1967.

Williams led the company's diversification, beginning with the purchase of manganese deposits in Oriente Province, Cuba.

 1930s 
In 1932, Freeport Sulphur Company acquired the sulfur rights for Lake Grande Ecaille and vicinity in Plaquemines Parish, Louisiana, and escalated the development of sulfur deposits in the Grand Ecaille dome in 1933, still using the Frasch Process developed by Dr. Herman Frasch, who had, in 1895, enjoined the American Sulphur Company into a partnership, forming the Union Sulphur Company, to initiate the first successful sulfur mining at Grand Ecaille, with which Freeport, like other competitors, would compete upon expiry of the Frasch patents in 1908. From its earliest inception, sulfur mining was the catalyst that developed Port Sulphur, Louisiana.

1950s
The company produced nickel during World War II and potash in the 1950s. In 1955, Freeport Nickel invested $119 million, of which $100 million came from the U.S. government, into  construction of a nickel-cobalt mine at Moa Bay, Cuba, and a refinery at Port Nickel, Louisiana. On March 11, 1957, the U.S. government announced a contract to buy nickel and cobalt from the company.

In 1956, the company formed the Freeport Oil Company. In 1958, the company sold an oil discovery near Lake Washington in Louisiana for approximately $100 million to Magnolia Petroleum Company.

In 1959, Freeport geologists confirmed the 1936 Dutch discovery of the rich Ertsberg copper and gold deposits, now known as the Grasberg mine, in extremely rugged, remote country in the Jayawijaya Mountains in what was then called the Netherlands New Guinea.

1960s
 In 1960, Fidel Castro implemented a 25% ore tax, effectively nationalizing and seizing Freeport's nickel-mining operations in Cuba.
 In 1961, the company entered the kaolin business after purchasing the assets of Southern Clays Inc. In 1964, the company formed Freeport of Australia to pursue mining opportunities there and in the surrounding Pacific Ocean region.

Development of the Ertsberg deposit

In 1967, the company negotiated a contract with the Indonesian government to develop the Ertsberg deposit. In their feasibility study, Freeport geologists estimated that the orebody totaled 33 million tons averaging 2.5% copper, making it the largest above-ground copper deposit ever discovered. Construction of an open pit mine began in May 1970 and in mid-1973 the mine was declared fully operational. Officials at Bechtel, the primary project contractor, called mine development at Ertsberg "the most difficult engineering project they had ever undertaken." The tramways were needed to move people, supplies and ore because a  cliff separates the Ertsberg mine (at  elevation) from the mill (at 10,000 feet). Moving copper concentrate from that mill to the shipping port required installation of a  slurry pipeline – then the world's longest. Mine construction and startup cost about US$200 million. The Ertsberg project was an engineering marvel, but the mine's early financial performance was disappointing. Depressed copper prices and high operating costs kept profits marginal during the 1970s.

In 1969, McMoRan Exploration Company was founded, which, in 1981, would merge with Freeport Minerals, formerly Freeport Sulphur, to form Freeport-McMoRan.

1970s
In 1971, the company changed its name to Freeport Minerals Company, (not to be confused with Freeport Minerals Corporation, founded in 1834).

1980s
In 1981, Freeport Minerals Company merged with the McMoRan Oil and Gas Company. The McMoRan Oil and Gas Company was founded in 1967 by three partners, William Kennon McWilliams Jr. ("Mc"), James Robert (Jim Bob) Moffett ("Mo"), who were both petroleum geologists, and Mack Rankin ("Ran"), "a specialist in land-leasing and sales operations."

In 1981, the company formed a 70/30 joint venture with an affiliate of FMC Corporation to operate the Jerritt Canyon gold mine near Elko, Nevada. In 1985, the company headquarters moved to New Orleans, Louisiana. The company also sold a 25% interest in oil and gas assets primarily in the western United States to Britoil for $73.5 million.

In 1989, the company sold about $1.5 billion in assets to finance development of the Grasberg mine and the Main Pass offshore sulfur-oil-gas deposit off Louisiana.

1990s
In 1994, the company completed the corporate spin-off of its entire interest in Freeport-McMoRan Copper & Gold, which owned the Grasberg mine.

In 1995, RTZ, a predecessor of Rio Tinto Group made a $450 million investment in the company.

In 1997, IMC Global, a large fertilizer producer, acquired Freeport-McMoRan Inc., the former parent company that now owned the sulfur and fertilizer businesses, in a $750 million transaction. Shareholders of Freeport-McMoRan received shares of IMC Global.

The Indonesian government asked Freeport to substantiate Bre-X's claims of having found the largest gold mine ever discovered. In 1997, the company announced that its prospective partner Bre-X did not have gold reserves at its Indonesian mine, as it had reported.  Bre-X subsequently was exposed as a fraud and went bankrupt.

In 1998, low commodity prices forced the company to suspend its dividend.

2000s
In 2003, the company was subpoenaed as part of an investigation by anti-trust authorities in the United States, Canada, and Europe into price fixing in the copper industry.

On March 19, 2007, the company acquired Phelps Dodge (for $25.9 Billion) and became the largest copper producer of any public company in the world. The corporate headquarters was moved from New Orleans, Louisiana to Phoenix, Arizona.

 2010s 
In 2012, the company announced agreements to acquire affiliated companies McMoRan Exploration Company and Plains Exploration & Production Company for a total enterprise value of over $20 billion. The transaction added significantly to the company's petroleum assets. The transaction was criticized as a conflict of interest due to the common ownership of the companies. In 2015, the company paid a $137.5 million settlement to resolve claims that executives and directors had conflicts of interest that resulted in the company overpaying in that transaction.

In 2014, the company sold its assets in the Eagle Ford shale to Encana for $3.1 billion. In 2015, the company announced job cuts at its Sierrita Mine in Arizona due to low copper and molybdenum prices.

On December 28, 2015, the company announced that James R. Moffett would resign as chairman of the company and be replaced by Gerald J. Ford. Moffett received $16.1 million in severance pay and cash retirement plans totaling more than $63 million. Moffett continued to consult for the company for annual fees of $1.5 million.

In May 2016, the company sold a 13% interest in its Morenci Mine to Sumitomo Group for $1 billion in cash.

In 2016, Freeport sold its deepwater assets, including the Marlin TLP, and the Holstein and Horn Mountain spars, to Anadarko Petroleum.

In August 2017, the company agreed to give a 51% interest in the Grasberg mine to the Government of Indonesia and build a smelter in exchange for a special permit to operate the mine until 2041.

In 2018, the company ranked at number 176 on the Fortune 500 list. During this year, Indonesian President Joko Widodo also planned to take control of 51% of Freeport Indonesia's equity, effectively handing over control of Freeport Control to Indonesian government. The Indonesian government will need to settle payments of $3.85 billion during the takeover process. The Indonesian government finalized the process on December 21, 2018.

Current operations
Freeport is the world's largest producer of molybdenum, and one of the largest producers of copper. In 2019, 79% of its revenues were from the sale of copper, 11% were from the sale of gold, and 8% were from the sale of molybdenum. In 2019, sales to the company's copper refining joint venture in Gresik Regency accounted for 13% of the total revenues of the company.

Some of the company's mining operations are as follows:

Africa
Freeport Cobalt held a 100% interest in Kisanfu, a copper and cobalt exploration project located near Tenke, Democratic Republic of the Congo. This subsidiary also owns a large cobalt refinery in Kokkola, Finland, along with a related sales and marketing business. FCX has an effective 56% of that enterprise. Negotiations in 2016  to include these cobalt projects in a sale to China Molybdenum of Tenke Fungurume Mine, a cobalt/copper mine in DRC Congo, were not successful. Instead, the Kisanfu mine was sold to China Molybdenum in a separate transaction in 2020.

Europe
In December 2019, Freeport Cobalt (a joint venture between Freeport-McMoRan and Lundin Mining) sold its cobalt refinery in Kokkola, Finland to Umicore. FCX held an effective 56% interest in that enterprise.

North America
 Morenci, Arizona – 72% owned (copper)
 Bagdad, Arizona – 100% owned (copper, molybdenum)
 Sierrita mine, Arizona (includes Twin Buttes & Esperanza) – 100% owned (copper, molybdenum)
 Miami, Arizona – 100% owned (copper)
 Safford mine, Safford, Arizona – 100% owned (copper)
 Chino mine, Santa Rita, New Mexico – 100% owned (copper, molybdenum)
 Tyrone, New Mexico – 100% owned (copper)
 Henderson molybdenum mine, Empire, Colorado – 100% owned (molybdenum)
 Climax mine, Leadville, Colorado – 100% owned (molybdenum)

South America
 El Abra, Chile – 51% owned (copper)
 Cerro Verde, Peru – 54% owned (copper, molybdenum)

Europe
 Atlantic Copper, Huelva, Spain – 100% owned copper refinery

Indonesia
 Grasberg, Papua province, Indonesia – 49% owned (copper, gold, silver)

Past holdings
 Jerritt Canyon mine, near Elko, Nevada has produced over 8 million ounces of gold since 1981. Originally a joint venture of Freeport McMoRan (FCX) with FMC Corporation, then FMC Gold then Meridian Gold, Freeport's share of Jerritt Canyon was then sold to Independence Mining Co., a subsidiary of Minorco (an Anglo American Corporation subsidiary). Minorco later divested all its gold mining assets to AngloGold. AngloGold and Meridian Gold sold the mine to Queenstake Resources in 2003. In 2007 Queenstake and Yukon Gold Corp merged to become Yukon-Nevada Gold, which in 2012 became Veris Gold. Veris Gold operated under U.S. Bankruptcy Code and the Companies’ Creditors Arrangement Act bankruptcy protections of Canada from June 9, 2014. Sprott Mining bought the concern after the Canadian bankruptcy court ordered Veris to sell its assets.
 In May 2016 Freeport announced an agreement to sell its interests in TF Holdings to China Molybdenum Co., Ltd. (CMOC) for $2.65 billion in cash and possibly more if the average copper price rose enough to trigger the increase in the following 24 months. TF Holdings was a Bermuda holding company with indirect ownership of 80% of Tenke Fungurume Mine. Since FCX had owned 70% ownership of TF Holdings, the sale gave China Molybdenum a 56% interest in Tenke Fungurume Mine. The parties discussed including Kokkola refinery and Kisanfu Exploration in the sale, but did not agree on the terms to do so.
 In December 2020, Freeport completed the sale of its interests in the Kisanfu undeveloped project in Democratic Republic of Congo to a wholly owned subsidiary of China Molybdenum Co., Ltd. for US$550 million.

Past board members
Past board members include Henry Kissinger, John Hay Whitney, Robert A. Lovett, Benno C. Schmidt Sr., Gus Long, Arleigh Burke, J. Stapleton Roy, Godfrey Rockefeller and his cousin-in-law, Jean Mauzé.

Controversies

 Safety record 
In 2011, Freeport was fined by the U.S. Department of Labor's Mine Safety and Health Administration over the death of a miner. The 67-year-old man had fallen into a hole created by the removal of two steel gratings. It was concluded that Freeport had not done enough to indicate that the hole was there.

Grasberg Mine

The company operates the world's largest and most profitable gold mine, the Grasberg mine in Papua, Indonesia.

In 2003, a landslide killed eight workers. A government study concluded that the incident was the result of negligence. Important warning signs had been detected two days prior. In response to this, management moved some equipment, but did not keep workers out of the area. A month later two workers died from being exposed to sulfur fumes. The government ultimately overturned its conclusion and attributed the incident to natural causes.

In 2005, The New York Times'' reported that the company paid local military and police generals, colonels, majors and captains, and military units, a total of nearly US$20 million between 1998 and 2004. One individual received up to US$150,000. The payments were meant to secure the reserve. The company responded that the payments did not go to individuals, but went into infrastructure, food, housing, fuel, travel, vehicle repairs, and allowances to cover incidental and administrative costs. According to the report, anonymous sources within the company claimed that company chairman James R. Moffet courted Indonesia's dictator Suharto and "his cronies", cutting them in on deals. Another employee is said to have worked on a program to monitor environmentalists' telephone and email conversations, in collaboration with Indonesian military intelligence officers.

The report, endorsed by Freeport, also estimated that during the life of the mine 3.2 billion tons of waste rocklarge components of which generate acidwould be dumped into the local river system. Overburden (waste rock) from the mine had already polluted a nearby lake due to acid mine drainage.

Citing extensive, long-term and irreversible environmental damage in New Guinea, The Government Pension Fund of Norway excluded Freeport-McMoRan from its investment portfolio, following a recommendation from the fund's ethical council.

In 2013, a tunnel collapse killed twenty eight workers. The Freeport geological team claimed that the collapse at the Big Gossan tunnel was caused by erosion of the ceiling, brought about by the continuous infiltration of the limestone wallrocks by corrosive acidic groundwater. Freeport was accused of negligence by the Indonesian National Human Rights Commission.

Human rights record in Indonesia 

The company is a signatory participant of the Voluntary Principles on Security and Human Rights. However, the company has been accused of funding the Indonesian government to secure its reserve through militaristic oppression of the native West Papuan people. Freeport has had a troubled relationship with the Amungme and Kamoro peoples since it arrived in Indonesia in 1967. Freeport allegedly damaged 30.000 hectares of the rainforest and two major rivers, on which they depend for their food, water, livelihoods, and traditions. Pressured by cultural and economic deterioration, there were numerous quarrels, between the tribes, Freeport, and the Indonesian military. Some unarmed natives were killed or tortured by the military, or became part of the Free Papua Movement insurgence.

Environmental record
Based on 2014 data, the Political Economy Research Institute ranked Freeport-McMoRan 13th among corporations emitting airborne pollutants in the U.S. The ranking is based on emission quantities and toxicity.

On October 15, 2009 the City of Blackwell filed suit against Freeport-McMoRan over the contamination caused by its Blackwell Zinc Smelter. The city considered the contamination a nuisance, and alleged that 58 million pounds of toxic waste remained in the city, causing illness within its 7,200 residents. The City of Blackwell and Freeport settled for $54M in February 2010. In 2012, Freeport agreed to a $119M settlement with the residents.

On April 2012, the U.S. Department of Justice announced that Freeport McMoran would pay $6.8M to settle federal and state charges pertaining to the toxic outflow from its Morenci mine in Arizona. According to the complaint waters, soils, habitats, and birds were either injured or lost as a result of the dangerous substances.

Carbon footprint
Freeport-McMoRan Inc reported Total CO2e emissions (Direct + Indirect) for the twelve months ending 31 December 2020 at 7,116 Kt (-653 /-8.4% y-o-y). Emissions have been on a declining trend since 2015.

References

External links
 

 Earth Observatory Satellite Picture of Grasberg Mine"

 
Mining companies of the United States
Copper mining companies of the United States
Gold mining companies of the United States
Oil companies of the United States
Companies based in Phoenix, Arizona
American companies established in 1912
Non-renewable resource companies established in 1912
1912 establishments in Texas
Companies listed on the New York Stock Exchange